Southcoast Mall is a shopping centre located in Shelly Beach, KwaZulu-Natal, South Africa. Southcoast Mall is the second largest shopping centre on the KwaZulu-Natal South Coast serving the Lower South Coast (from Hibberdene to Port Edward) along with Shelly Centre which is the largest shopping centre on the South Coast.

History 
Southcoast Mall was a joint development by Hyprop Investments Limited and Redefine Income Fund Limited/Redefine Properties at a cost of approximately R195m and opened in November 2005.

In 2011, Hyprop Investment and Redefine Properties had decided to sell Southcoast Mall and to focus on core assets mainly in Gauteng where they are based. Hyprop Investment sold its 50% stake in the shopping centre however Redefine Properties later decided to retain its ownership of the shopping centre.

In 2014, the Southcoast Mall undergone a substantial reconfiguration which would occur in three phases, which will run successively one after the other.

Phase 1 of the development saw the construction of new premises to house Galaxy Bingo, a premier gaming facility which is currently near the middle entrance to the centre, the relocation of Ramsgate Stationers, to new premises within the centre and the commencement of the new Mr Price Sport and Food Lover's Market stores.

After the completion of phase 1, the two adjacent entrances were revamped during phases 2 and as well as the food court and toilet facilities.

In 2018, Southcoast Mall was voted as the “Best Of South Coast”  in the shopping centre category at the South Coast Herald Readers’ Choice Awards. This was the first time the mall had won the accolade.

Location 
Southcoast Mall is located on the outskirts of the town of Shelly Beach on the KwaZulu-Natal's South Coast. It is specifically situated at the Shelly Beach and Izotsha Road offramp on the N2/R61 highway to Durban, Port Shepstone and Port Edward.

Tenants 
Southcoast Mall has over 75 stores with anchor tenants of the mall including:

 Builders Express
 Checkers
 Dis-Chem
 Food Lover's Market
 House & Home
 Game

Southcoast Mall is centered on a large internal central walkway, with anchor tenants at either end and line shops running along the length of the mall.

References 

Shopping centres in South Africa
Economy of KwaZulu-Natal
Ugu District Municipality